FC Zvyahel-750 Novohrad-Volynskyi is a Ukrainian football club from Zviahel, Zhytomyr Oblast. Zvyahel is the original name for Novohrad-Volynskyi.

History
The club was founded in 2007 on the 750th anniversary of the city of Zvyahel (Novohrad-Volynskyi). It participates in the regional competition.

In 2010 the club made it to the final of the Ukrainian Amateur Football Championship.

In 2011, the city authorities of Novohrad-Volynskyi decided to revive former Soviet club Avanhard.

Honors
Ukrainian Amateur Football Championship
Runners-up (1): 2010
 Zhytomyr Oblast championship
Winners (1): 2010
Runners-up (1): 2009

League and cup history

{|class="wikitable"
|-bgcolor="#efefef"
! Season
! Div.
! Pos.
! Pl.
! W
! D
! L
! GS
! GA
! P
!Domestic Cup
!colspan=2|Europe
!Notes
|}

References

External links
 Football club website

Football clubs in Zhytomyr Oblast
Amateur football clubs in Ukraine
Sport in Zviahel
2007 establishments in Ukraine
Association football clubs established in 2007